Urgence Mouega (born 16 November 1994) is a taekwondo practitioner from Gabon who won a gold medal in the women's lightweight at the 2011 All-Africa Games. In the same event at the 2015 African Games she finished with a bronze medal. She has competed in two editions of the World Taekwondo Championships. At the 2016 African Taekwondo Olympic Qualification Tournament she was a semi-final win away from qualifying for the Rio Olympics.

References

1994 births
Living people
Gabonese taekwondo practitioners
African Games gold medalists for Gabon
African Games bronze medalists for Gabon
African Games medalists in taekwondo
Competitors at the 2011 All-Africa Games
Competitors at the 2015 African Games
Competitors at the 2019 African Games
21st-century Gabonese women